After the Fall is an album by the Irish musician Mary Coughlan, released in 1997. It followed a tumultuous period in her life, after which she embraced sobriety.

After the Fall was Coughlan's first studio album to be widely distributed in the United States. A video was produced for "When I Am Laid in Earth", which was shot at Neil Jordan's former house.

Production
Recorded in Ireland, the album was produced by Erik Visser. The lyrics to "Dilemma" were based on a poem by Dorothy Parker. "Saint Judy" was written by Marc Almond. "Poison Words" is about domestic violence. "When I Am Laid in Earth" is based on the composition by Henry Purcell.

Critical reception

New Internationalist  called "Woman Undone" "a stunningly well-wrought take on the lapsarian fable ... Powered along by plucked strings and an airy, expansive feel, it's both wry and angry." The Morning Call determined that Coughlan weaves "this chronicle of bouts with addiction and depression and the pain of divorce with coal-black humor." Robert Christgau praised "Sunburn".

Newsday stated: "A quietly smoldering singer whose authoritative voice is tinged with smoky traces of blues and jazz, Coughlan makes adult pop music about adult problems." The Guardian concluded that "the enervated piano/sax backing is classic torch." The St. Paul Pioneer Press deemed After the Fall "a stunning album that should be heard by anyone who thinks that the music industry doesn't have time for quality anymore and that 'women's music' is relegated to airbrushed pop and video-friendly babes."

AllMusic wrote: "Inflected with whimsy, wonder and cynicism, Coughlan wends her way through torch songs and laments of women undone, men unemployed and the world in confusion."

Track listing

References

Mary Coughlan (singer) albums
1997 albums
Big Cat Records albums